The Klondike is a region of the territory of Yukon, in northwestern Canada. It lies around the Klondike River, a small river that enters the Yukon River from the east at Dawson City. 

The area is merely an informal geographic region, and has no function to the territory as any kind of administrative region.

The Klondike is famed due to the Klondike Gold Rush, which started in 1896 and lasted until 1899. Gold has been mined continuously in that area, except for a pause in the late 1960s and early 1970s.

Climate
The climate is warm in the short summer, and very cold during the long winter. By late October, ice forms over the rivers.

Politics 
Klondike is a district of the Legislative Assembly of Yukon. The current Premier of the Yukon, Liberal Sandy Silver, represents the electoral district of Klondike.

References

Hän 
Geography of Yukon
Klondike Gold Rush
Geographic regions of Canada